Keyworth is a surname. Notable people with the surname include: 

Andrew Stanley Keyworth (1923–1996), New Zealand mariner
George A. Keyworth II (1939–2017), American physicist
Gwyneth Keyworth (born 1990), Welsh actress
Henry Keyworth Raine (1872–1934), British portraitist
John Keyworth (1859–1954), British archer
John Keyworth Boynton (11918–2007), British legal officer
Jon Keyworth (born 1950), American football player
Ken Keyworth (1934–2000), British football player
Leonard James Keyworth (1893–1915), English recipient of the Victoria Cross
Mark Keyworth (1948–2014), English rugby player
Sarah Keyworth (born 1993), English stand-up comedian